The Championship consisted of 12 participants.

Participants
 FC Karpaty Yaremche
 FC Delta Hvizdets
 FC Teplovyk Ivano-Frankivsk
 FC Halychyna Halych
 FC Beskyd Nadvirna
 FC Tuzhyliv
 FC Kniahynyn Pidhaytsi
 FC Sokil Uhryniv
 FC Probiy Horodenka
 FC Hazovyk Bohorodchany
 FC Kalush
 FC Spartak Sniatyn
 FC Chornohora-Nika Ivano-Frankivsk (newly entered, Second League 2008)
 FC Prydnistrovya Tlumach (newly entered, Second League 2008 runner-up)
 FC Khutrovyk Tysmenytsia (newly entered, Second League 2008)
 FC Naftovyk Dolyna (newly entered, relegated from the Ukrainian Second League)

Note:
 FC Cementnyk Yamnytsia withdrew after 2008 championship
 FC Prykarpattia-2 Ivano-Frankivsk was taken out of competition upon conclusion of 2008 championship
 FC Hutsulschyna Kosiv withdrew to the Oblast Second League
 FC Kolomyia never reapplied
 FC Pokuttia-Neptune Sniatyn was renamed into Spartak once FC Neptune Zabolotiv reentered the Oblast Second League once again
 FC Enerhetyk-Halychyna-2 Halych became simply FC Halychyna Halych

See also
Ivano-Frankivsk Oblast Second League 2009
Ivano-Frankivsk Oblast FF

 
4
4